Antipolo held its local elections on Monday, May 13, 2019, as a part of the 2019 Philippine general election. Voters elected candidates for the local elective posts in the city: the mayor, the vice mayor, the two district congressmen, the two provincial board members of Rizal (one for each district) and the sixteen councilors (eight for each district).

There are a total of 336,773 people who voted out of the 482,062 registered voters. Andrea Ynares and Josefina Gatlabayan won the elections undefeated as mayor and vice mayor (for the second time) respectively.

Background
Incumbent Mayor Casimiro Ynares III won't ran for re-election. The one who ran in his place is her wife and brother of actor and Senator Bong Revilla, Andrea Bautista-Ynares. Bautista-Ynares ran unopposed.

Incumbent Vice Mayor Josefina "Pining" Gatlabayan ran for second term unopposed.

Incumbent First District Representative Chiqui Roa-Puno won't sought re-election. Her husband, former Representative Roberto Puno ran for her instead. Puno was challenged by Macario Aggarao.

Incumbent Second District Representative Romeo Acop was on his third and final term. His wife, Dr. Resureccion "Doktora Cion" Acop ran for his place unopposed.

Incumbent First District Board Member Enrico "Rico" De Guzman won't ran for re-election, instead he ran as councilor. The one who ran in his place is the son of former Representative Roberto "Robbie" Puno, Roberto Andres "Randy" Puno. Puno was challenged by Delfin Bacon, who withdrew his candidacy before election.

Incumbent Second District Board Member Atty. Jesus Angelito "Joel" Huertas Jr. is on third term. He ran as councilor instead. Former Councilor Alexander "Bobot" Marquez ran for his place instead. Marquez was challenged by Edelberto "Edel" Coronado.

Results

For Mayor
Incumbent Mayor Casimiro Ynares III won't ran for re-election. The one who ran to his place is his wife and brother of actor and Senator Bong Revilla, Andrea Bautista-Ynares. Bautista-Ynares ran unopposed.

For Vice Mayor
Incumbent Vice Mayor Josefina "Pining" Gatlabayan ran for second term unopposed.

For Representative

First District 
Incumbent First District Representative Chiqui Roa-Puno won't sought re-election. Her husband, former Representative Roberto Puno ran for her instead. Puno was challenged by Macario "Mack" Aggarao.

Second District 
Incumbent Second District Representative Romeo Acop was on his third and final term. His wife, Dr. Resureccion "Doktora Cion" Acop ran for his place unopposed.

For Board Member

First District 
Incumbent First District Board Member Enrico "Rico" De Guzman won't ran for re-election, instead he ran as councilor. The one who ran in his place is the son of former Representative Roberto "Robbie" Puno, Roberto Andres "Randy" Puno. Puno was challenged by Delfin Bacon, who withdrew his candidacy before election.

Second District 
Incumbent Second District Board Member Atty. Jesus Angelito "Joel" Huertas Jr. was on third and final term. He ran as councilor instead. Former Councilor Alexander "Bobot" Marquez ran for his place instead. Marquez was challenged by Edelberto "Edel" Coronado.

For City Councilors (by ticket) 
With Ynares & Gatlabayan running unopposed, Team Ynares is the only ticket for this election.

Team Ynares

For City Councilors (by District)

First District

Second District

References

2019 Philippine local elections
Politics of Antipolo
Elections in Antipolo
May 2019 events in the Philippines
2019 elections in Calabarzon